Camp Barneo is a private temporary tourist resort located on Arctic Ocean ice near the North Pole. When it is occupied for a few weeks in April, it is the northernmost inhabited place in the world. It was first established in 2002 and re-occupied annually thereafter, but it has remained vacant since 2018. When operating, the price for a visit starts at about $20,000.

History
The first Ice Camp Barneo near the North Pole was established in 2002. Since that time, the camp has been rebuilt from scratch every year because of the constantly drifting Arctic ice.

The ice camp works under the patronage of the Russian Geographical Society and normally lasts for the month of April.

Ice Camp Barneo should not be confused with the sequential Soviet/Russian "North Pole" drifting ice stations established by the Russian Academy of Sciences Arctic and Antarctic Research Institute (AARI).

From 2002 to 2017, the starting and final point of all expeditions to Barneo has been Longyearbyen, the capital of the Svalbard archipelago of Norway. The town has necessary facilities including an airport, hotels of different levels, restaurants, a post office, a bank, and a supermarket.

In 2016, following military exercises by Chechen paratroopers on Barneo, Norway enacted a flight embargo, which it later lifted.  As a result, the 2017 event was expected to take place with a base in Russia. However, in March 2017 an expedition tour operator was taking bookings for 2017 and 2018 with flights operating out of Longyearbyen.

In 2019, a political dispute between Russia and Ukraine prevented tourists from flying to the camp. The 2020 and 2021 seasons were cancelled as a result of the COVID-19 pandemic. Plans to reopen in 2022 were cancelled after the Russian invasion of Ukraine.

Notable visitors 

 Dixie Dansercoer, polar explorer
 Albert II, Prince of Monaco
 Miki Ando, figure skater
 Eric Philips, polar explorer
 Ramón Hernando de Larramendi, polar explorer

See also
List of northernmost settlements

References

External links 
 Barneo Base
 News from Barneo Apr 18, 2007
 Vicaar International Projects and Expeditions site
 News from Barneo 2012
 Russian Geographic Society
 Camp Barneo official Facebook page
 Camp Barneo official website

Populated places of Arctic Russia
North Pole